Dilara Hanif Rita (born 11 July 1984), known by her stage name Purnima, is a Bangladeshi film actress. She won Bangladesh National Film Award for Best Actress for her performance in the film Ora Amake Bhalo Hote Dilo Na (2010), written and directed by Kazi Hayat.

Early life
Purnima was born on 11 July 1981 in Chittagong to Mohammad Hanif and Sufia Begum She has two sisters - Brishty and Dilruba Hanif.

Career
Purnima made her film debut with E Jibon Tomar Amar in 1998 when she was in junior school. She acted alongside Riaz in Indian-Bangladeshi film Moner Majhe Tumi in 2003. Her notable performance includes Megher Por Megh (2004) based on the liberation war of Pakistani and directed by Chashi Nazrul Islam.

Purnima acted in Shuva, a story based on Rabindranath Tagore's short story "Shuvashini".Shasti (2004), based on the same story, earned her critical acclaim.

Purnima played a mute girl in the movie Shubha (2006). Her other notable commercial successes include Hridoyer Kotha 2006 and Akash Chhoa Bhalobasa (2008) and Poran Jaye Jolia Re (2010), which won her a Bangladesh National Film Award, Matir Thikana in (2011), I love you (2012) and Judge Barrister Police Commissioner (2013).

Personal life
Purnima married a businessman named Mostaq Kibria on September 6, 2005, and divorced him on May 15, 2007. After her first marriage broke up, she married Ahmed Jamal Fahad on 4 November 2007. With Fahad, she has a daughter named Arshia Umaiza. After their divorce, she married again Ashfaqur Rahman Robin on 27 May 2022.

Filmography

Television

Awards

References

External links
 
 
 

1981 births
Living people
People from Chittagong
Bangladeshi film actresses
Bangladeshi television actresses
Best Actress National Film Awards (Bangladesh) winners
Best Film Actress Meril-Prothom Alo Award winners
Best Actress Bachsas Award winners